Forbidden is the eighteenth studio album by English rock band Black Sabbath, released in June 1995. This recording saw the reunion of Black Sabbath's Tyr-era line-up from 1990, with the return of Neil Murray and Cozy Powell. It was the last album to feature Tony Martin on vocals and Geoff Nicholls on keyboards, and the last by the band until 2013 when Ozzy Osbourne and Geezer Butler returned for the album 13. The album sold 21,000 copies in the US in its first week and as of 2013, Forbidden has sold 191,000 copies in the US.

The album received a generally negative response from critics and fans alike. After its release, the band underwent several line-up changes and found itself at a career crossroads. However, original Black Sabbath vocalist Ozzy Osbourne would reconcile with guitarist Tony Iommi not long afterwards.

Background and recording
The recording of Forbidden followed some late lineup changes within the band, with Butler replaced by Murray and Powell returning in the immediate aftermath of the 1994 Cross Purposes tour. Writing and rehearsals took place at Bluestone Farm in Wales, ahead of recording at Parr Street Studios, Liverpool that December. According to a July 1995 interview by Tony Iommi for the Boston radio station WBCN, the album took ten days to record. The album was launched in June 1995.

Musically, the release draws on traditional heavy metal and power metal styles as well as influences from blues. Ernie C of the rap metal band Body Count produced, recorded and mixed the album. The album's opening track, "The Illusion of Power", features a verse by Body Count member Ice-T, delivering a spoken word part during the song's bridge.

Reception and legacy

Forbidden was panned by critics upon its release. AllMusic's Bradley Torreano gave the album only one and a half stars, remarking that "with boring songs, awful production, and uninspired performances, this is easily avoidable for all but the most enthusiastic fan". He also stated that he considered it a "sad state of affairs" given the band's long history. Blender magazine called Forbidden "an embarrassment ... the band's worst album".

Band members have since spoken about their mixed opinions of the album. Vocalist Tony Martin made known his feelings in an interview in July 2011, during which he stated: "Well, Forbidden is... I want to say 'crap', but it's actually not". He added that he thought the songs worked in rehearsals, but other factors, such as rumours of a reunion of the original Black Sabbath line-up and the record company wanting to "take [the album] and see what Ice-T wanted to do", gave the album a "distinct ill feeling". Martin also maintained that he never believed a "Run-D.M.C. type"/"Rap Sabbath" album would work. Rob Zombie gave some lighter praise at the launch, stating "There is one easy way to figure out the lasting power of Black Sabbath. There's always certain bands that get a great reaction and Black Sabbath is always one of them." In regards to the subsequent original line-up reunion, Martin has also said Forbidden was a "filler album that got the band out of the label deal, rid of the singer, and into the reunion", but remarked that he "wasn't privy to that information at the time".

Guitarist Tony Iommi has admitted to Sabbath fanzine Southern Cross that he was "not happy" with Forbidden. He elaborated by saying, "We brought in Ernie C to do production, which was a bit difficult really, because I had to leave him to it… One of the problems was we weren't all there at the same time, when we were writing it. Cozy and Neil were still contracted to do other stuff, so it ended up with just Tony Martin, Geoff Nicholls and myself just jamming around and putting ideas down. It all came together very quickly and we didn't have time to reflect: make sure it was the right songs and the right way of doing it." Iommi reiterated his dissatisfaction with the album to the Birmingham Mail newspaper.

Remix
On 4 March 2016, Iommi discussed future re-releases of the Tony Martin-era catalogue. He explained: "We've held back on the reissues of those albums because of the current Sabbath thing with Ozzy Osbourne, but they will certainly be happening... I'd like to do a couple of new tracks for those releases with Tony Martin... I'll also be looking at working on Cross Purposes and Forbidden." In 2019, Iommi said he was working on a remix of Forbidden "on and off" with Mike Exeter. 

On 14 May 2020, during an interview with Eddie Trunk, Iommi revealed that the remix of the album was complete and he was just waiting for "the right time" to re-release the album.

Track listing

Personnel
Black Sabbath
Tony Iommi – guitars
Tony Martin – vocals
Cozy Powell – drums
Neil Murray – bass
Geoff Nicholls – keyboards

Additional musicians
Ice-T – additional vocals on "The Illusion of Power"

Production
Ernie C – producer, engineer, mixing at Ridge Farm Studio, UK
Bobby Brooks – engineer, mixing
Andrea Wright, Phill Luff – assistant engineers
Geoff Pesche – mastering at Townhouse Studios, London

Charts

References

External links
 

1995 albums
Black Sabbath albums
I.R.S. Records albums